"Let It Rain" is a song by Australian singer-songwriter Delta Goodrem, co-written by Goodrem with Matthew Copley and Marla Altschuler. It was released on 6 January 2020 by Sony Music Australia. The song was written in the wake of the devastating 2019–2020 bushfires in Australia. A live, stripped-down version of the song was first uploaded on Goodrem's Instagram page on New Year's Day 2020.

Goodrem recorded a full studio version, with all proceeds of the single to go towards the bushfire relief effort. This version was made available for download on 6 January, and quickly topped the Australian iTunes chart. The song was also a minor hit in Hungary and Scotland. The song has been used by 7 News and the Nine Network to promote fundraising efforts.

Live performances
The song was first performed live as part of Goodrem's set at the internationally televised bushfire benefit concert Fire Fight Australia, and a live recording of the song was included on the charity compilation Artists Unite for Fire Fight: Concert for National Bushfire Relief, which debuted at number one on the ARIA albums chart.

The song was also performed live a few days later on the Today show as part of a special episode broadcast from Lakes Entrance, one of the areas affected by the fires.

Music video
A music video for the song was uploaded to Goodrem's YouTube channel on 8 January. The video was shot in monochrome and shows her performing the song on a grand piano in a large empty recording studio. The video was directed by Goodrem herself.

Charts

Release history

References

2020 singles
2020 songs
Charity singles
Delta Goodrem songs
Pop ballads
Songs written by Delta Goodrem